Mykola Puzderko (born June 13, 1990) is a Ukrainian freestyle skier, specializing in  aerials.

Puzderko competed at the 2014 Winter Olympics for Ukraine and he finished 20th.

Puzderko made his World Cup debut in February 2011. As of January 2015, he has the best result 10th in 2014/15 at Deer Valley. His best World Cup overall finish in aerials is 27th, in 2012/13.

Performances

World Cup

Positions

References

1990 births
Living people
Olympic freestyle skiers of Ukraine
Ukrainian male freestyle skiers
Freestyle skiers at the 2014 Winter Olympics